The 35th American Society of Cinematographers Awards was held virtually on April 18, 2021, honoring the best cinematographers of film and television in 2020.

The nominees were announced on March 10, 2021.

Winners and nominees

Film

Television

Awards honorees
Board of Governors Award: Sofia Coppola

References

2020
2020 film awards
2020 television awards
American
2020 in American cinema